Henry Noga was a U.S. soccer goalkeeper who earned two caps with the U.S. national team.  Both games, which were World Cup qualifiers, came in November 1960.  The first was a 3-3 tie with Mexico on November 6.  The second was a 3-0 loss to Mexico seven days later.

References

External links

United States men's international soccer players
Living people
Association football goalkeepers
American soccer players
Year of birth missing (living people)